Nienburg II – Schaumburg is an electoral constituency (German: Wahlkreis) represented in the Bundestag. It elects one member via first-past-the-post voting. Under the current constituency numbering system, it is designated as constituency 40. It is located in central Lower Saxony, comprising the district of Schaumburg and most of the district of Nienburg.

Nienburg II – Schaumburg was created for the inaugural 1949 federal election. Since 2017, it has been represented by Marja-Liisa Völlers of the Social Democratic Party (SPD).

Geography
Nienburg II – Schaumburg is located in central Lower Saxony. As of the 2021 federal election, it comprises the district of Schaumburg and the district of Nienburg with the exception of the Samtgemeinden of Uchte and Grafschaft Hoya.

History
Nienburg II – Schaumburg was created in 1949, then known as Nienburg – Schaumburg-Lippe. In the 1965 through 1976 elections, it was simply named Schaumburg. In the 1980 through 1998 elections, it was named Nienburg – Schaumburg. It acquired its current name in the 2002 election. In the inaugural Bundestag election, it was Lower Saxony constituency 22 in the numbering system. From 1953 through 1961, it was number 44. From 1965 through 1976, it was number 35. From 1980 through 1998, it was number 34. In the 2002 and 2005 elections, it was number 40. In the 2009 election, it was number 41. Since the 2013 election, it has been number 40.

Originally, the constituency comprised the districts of Schaumburg-Lippe and Nienburg excluding the Samtgemeinde of Uchte. In the 1965 through 1976 elections, it comprised the entirety of the districts of Schaumburg-Lippe, Grafschaft Schaumburg, and Neustadt am Rübenberge. In the 1980 through 1998 elections, it comprised the entirety of the Schaumburg and Nienburg districts. In the 2002 election, the Samtgemeinden of Uchte and Grafschaft Hoya were transferred away from the constituency.

Members
The constituency has been held by the Social Democratic Party (SPD) during all but three Bundestag terms since 1949. Its first representative was Otto Heinrich Greve of the SPD, who served from 1949 to 1961. Future President of Germany Gustav Heinemann served one term as representative from 1961 to 1965. Friedrich Blume then served from 1965 to 1969. Friedel Schirmer was representative from 1969 to 1983, when the Christian Democratic Union (CDU) candidate Helmut Rode won the constituency. Ernst Kastning of the SPD won in 1987, but Rode won again in 1990. Kastning returned in 1994 and served a single term. Sebastian Edathy was elected in 1998, and served until his resignation in 2014. In 2017, the CDU won the constituency for only the third time in its history; Maik Beermann served as representative. Marja-Liisa Völlers regained it for the SPD in 2021.

Election results

2021 election

2017 election

2013 election

2009 election

References

Federal electoral districts in Lower Saxony
2002 establishments in Germany
Constituencies established in 2002
Nienburg (district)
Schaumburg